William Lee Martin (7 February 1870 – 21 December 1950), known as Lee Martin, was a New Zealand politician of the Labour Party.

Biography

Early life
Martin was born in Oamaru in 1870. He received his education at Waimate District High School and at Christchurch Normal School. After school, he was an officer for The Salvation Army for six years. Afterwards, he was a painter and joined the Labour movement in Wanganui in 1902, was Secretary of the Wanganui Painters’ Union (1909–1912) and, for 4 years, a member of the Wanganui Technical School Board. He became a dairy farmer at Matangi in the Waikato and had two years as president of the Waikato Farmers’ Union. He was in the Salvation Army and Methodist Church and served for many years on school committees, Tamahere Road Board, Matangi Glaxo Factory Suppliers' Committee and as a member of the Central Waikato Electric Power Board from its formation in 1920.

He was a committee member of the Workers' Educational Association (WEA) and member of the League of Nations Union co-operation committee.

Political career

He was unsuccessful when he stood for Hamilton in 1925, but in a  won Raglan, which was a big upset for the Reform Party. He held Raglan until 1931. He then lost it to Stewart Reid of Reform, but won the electorate back in the 1935 general election.

He was Minister of Agriculture from 1935 to 1941 in the First Labour Government, first under Savage and then under Fraser. In September 1939 when Cabinet was passing nearly 30 war regulations as laid down in the War Book, Lee Martin denied knowledge of one of his regulations. Fraser became tetchy until Nash leaned over and silently pointed to the minister's signature on the paper.  While still a member of the Cabinet he retired as a minister in 1941 owing to ill-health. He subsequently retired from Parliament at the 1943 general election.

He was appointed to the Legislative Council on 31 January 1946, and served there until his death on 21 December 1950, only days before the Legislative Council was abolished (on 31 December). He was buried at Hamilton East Cemetery.

Family
In 1894 Lee Martin married Harriet Wilhelmina Warnes, of Greymouth, at the Salvation Army Citadel, Dunedin, she also being a Salvation Army officer. They lived in Wellington and Wanganui before farming at Matangi from about 1912. They had three sons and three daughters, one of whom was nurse Iris Martin.

Notes

References

1870 births
1950 deaths
New Zealand Labour Party MPs
New Zealand farmers
Members of the Cabinet of New Zealand
New Zealand Methodists
Members of the New Zealand Legislative Council
New Zealand Labour Party MLCs
People from Oamaru
New Zealand MPs for North Island electorates
Members of the New Zealand House of Representatives
Unsuccessful candidates in the 1925 New Zealand general election
Unsuccessful candidates in the 1931 New Zealand general election
Burials at Hamilton East Cemetery